Gurbachan Singh Jagat (born 1 July 1942) is a former Governor of the State of Manipur in India. He was appointed to this office on 1 July 2007 and retired as the governor on 22 July 2013. Distinguished public servant Gurbachan Jagat has joined as a trustee of The Tribune, Chandigarh on 2 May 2016.  

He studied English at university and became a member of the Indian Police Service in 1964 in the Union Territory (AGMUT) Cadre. He served as ACP and Addl DCP in Delhi, SP in Meghalaya during 1971 War, Commandant, BSF, SSP in Goa, Deputy Commissioner (Special Branch) and Joint Commissioner (Headquarters) in Delhi Police, DIG of Chandigarh Police, IG of BSF in Jammu Frontier HQ, IG of BSF in North Bengal Frontier HQ, ADG (Armed) of Jammu and Kashmir and as Director-General of Police in Jammu and Kashmir from February 1997 until December 2000.  He was then appointed Director General of the Border Security Force, a post he held until June 2002, at which time he was appointed to the Union Public Service Commission. He served on the UPSC for five years, eighteen months as chair, until being appointed Governor of Manipur.

See also
 Governors and Lieutenant-Governors of states of India
 Governors of Manipur
 List of Governors of Indian states
 Manipur

References

Governors of Manipur
Governors of Nagaland
Indian police officers
Living people
1942 births
Recipients of the Padma Shri in civil service
Chairmen of Union Public Service Commission